Dietrich V was Count of Cleves from 1201 through 1260. Dietrich was born about 1185 as the son of Dietrich IV, Count of Cleves and Margaret of Holland.

Possibly Dietrich V succeeded in 1198, under regency of Arnold II.

In 1234, he participated in the Stedinger Crusade.

Marriage and Issue 
In c. 1215 he married Mathilda of Dinslaken (d. 1226). Their children were:

 Dietrich of Cleves (c.1216), married Elizabeth of Brabant
 Margaretha of Cleves (c.1218), married Otto II of Guelders 

Secondly, he married Hedwig of Meissen (d. 1249), daughter of Theodoric I, Margrave of Meissen. Their children were:

 Dietrich VI of Cleves (c. 1226), married Adelaide of Heinsberg
 Dietrich Luf I of Cleves (c. 1228)
 Agnes of Cleves (c. 1230), married Bernard IV, Lord of Lippe
 Jutta of Cleves (c. 1232), married Waleran IV, Duke of Limburg

References

Sources

Counts of Cleves
1260 deaths
Year of birth unknown
People of the Stedinger Crusade
1185 births